A multitude of schools and universities have been named after St. Francis Xavier, a Spanish Roman Catholic saint and co-founder of the Society of Jesus. This page lists notable educational institutions named after St. Xavier, arranged by country and region. Many of these schools are run by the Jesuit order, while some are operated by the Xaverian Brothers and various dioceses.

Australia

Australian Capital Territory
 St. Francis Xavier College, Canberra

Queensland
 St Francis Xavier Primary School, Gold Coast

New South Wales
 St Francis Xavier's College, Hamilton
 Xavier High School, Albury
 Xavier Catholic College, Skennars Head, Ballina
 Xavier Catholic College, Llandilo, Penrith

South Australia
 Xavier College, Adelaide, Gawler Belt

Victoria
 Xavier College, Kew, Melbourne
 St. Francis Xavier College, Beaconsfield, Berwick, Officer

Bangladesh
 St Francis Xavier's Green Herald International School, Mohammadpur, Dhaka

Belgium
 Collège Saint-François-Xavier (SFXun), Verviers, Walloon
 Xaverius College, Borgerhout, Antwerp, Flanders

Brazil
 Colégio São Francisco Xavier, Ipiranga, São Paulo
 Colégio São Francisco Xavier, Maringá, Paraná

Cambodia
 Xavier Jesuit School, Banteay Meanchey province, Cambodia

Canada

Alberta
 St. Francis Xavier High School, Edmonton

British Columbia
 St. Francis Xavier School, Vancouver

Newfoundland & Labrador
 Xavier Junior High School, Deer Lake

Nova Scotia
 St. Francis Xavier University, Antigonish

Ontario
 St. Francis Xavier Catholic High School, Ottawa
 St. Francis Xavier Secondary School, Mississauga
 St. Francis Xavier Catholic Secondary School, Milton

Chile
 Colegio San Francisco Javier, Puerto Montt, Los Lagos

Colombia
 Colegio San Francisco Javier, Pasto, Nariño
 Pontifical Xavierian University, Bogotá, Distrito Capital
 Pontifical Xavierian University, Cali, Valle del Cauca

Ecuador
 Colegio Javier, Guayaquil, Guayas

Guatemala
 Colegio Liceo Javier

Hong Kong
 St. Francis Xavier's College, Tai Kok Tsui, Kowloon
 St. Francis Xavier's School, Tsuen Wan, Tsuen Wan, New Territories

India

Andhra Pradesh
 St. Xavier's Elementary and High School (E.M. and T.M.), Xavier Nagar, Eluru, West Godavari District
 St. Xavier's High School, Darsi
 St. Xavier's High School, Madannapet, Hyderabad

Assam
 St. Xavier's Public School, Sonai, Silchar
 St. Xavier's School, Doom Dooma, Rupai Siding
 St. Xavier's School, Duliajan
 St. Xavier's School, Naharkatia

Bihar
 St. Francis Xavier's Academy, Muzaffarpur
 St. Xavier's College of Education, Patna
 St. Xavier's High School,  Amb
 St. Xavier's High School, Anwari, Mohania
 St. Xavier's High School, Aurangabad
 St. Xavier's High School, Biswan
 St. Xavier's High School, Chakia
 St. Xavier's High School, Gopalganj
 St. Xavier's High School, Hajipur
 St. Xavier's High School, Lalganj
 St. Xavier's High School, Mahua
 St. Xavier's High School, Motihari
 St. Xavier's High School, Narkatiyaganj
 St. Xavier's High School, Patna
 St. Xavier's High School, Ranti, Madhubani
 St. Xavier's High School, Shahpur Patori
 St. Xavier's High School, Shambhupatti, Samastipur
 St. Xavier's High School, Supaul
 St. Xavier's High School, Tirbirwa
 St. Xavier's High School, Vishwanathnagar Park, Begusarai
 St. Xavier's Higher Secondary School, Bettiah
 St. Xavier's International School, Muzaffarpur
 St. Xavier's Jr/Sr School, Muzaffarpur
 St. Xavier's Public School, Bhagalpur
 St. Xavier's Public School, Darbhanga
 St. Xavier's Public School, Forbesganj
 St. Xavier's Public School, Purnea

Delhi
 St. Xavier's School, Civil Lines
 St. Xavier's School, Rohini

Goa
 St. Xavier's College, Bastora

Gujarat
 St. Xavier's, Adipur
 St. Xavier's High School, Bhuj
 St. Xavier's High School, Gandhinagar
 St. Xavier's High School, Jamnagar
 St. Xavier's High School, Loyola Hall, Ahmedabad
 St. Xavier's High School, Mirzapur, Ahmedabad
 St. Xavier's High School, Surat
 St. Xavier's College, Ahmedabad
 St. Xavier's School, Umreth
 St. Xavier's High School, Nivalda, Dediapada
 St. Xavier's English medium school, Nani Singloti, Dediapada 
 St. Xavier's High School, Relva
 St. Xavier's High School, Umarpada

Haryana
 St. Xavier's Public School, Kalanwali, Dist- Sirsa, Haryana, India
 St. Xavier's Public School, Bhuna Road, Fatehabad, Haryana, India
 St. Xavier's Public School, Ratia, Dist-Fatehabad, Haryana, India

Jharkhand
 Xavier Labour Relations Institute, now the XLRI School of Business and Human Resources, Jamshedpur
 St. Xavier's College, Ranchi
 St. Xavier's College, Simdega
 St. Xavier's English School, Chakradharpur
 St. Xavier's English School and Junior College, Chaibasa
 St. Xavier's High School, Gadi Tundi, Dhanbad
 St. Xavier's School, Bokaro
 St. Xavier's School, Ranchi
 St. Xavier's, Hazaribagh
 St. Xavier's Public School, Asansol
 St. Xavier's Public School, Ranchi
 St. Xavier's School, Sahibganj
 Xavier Institute of Social Service, Ranchi

Karnataka
 St. Francis Xavier Girls' High School, Fraser Town, Bangalore
 St. Xavier's College, Bangalore
 St. Xavier's Boys High School, Shivajinagar, Bangalore
 St. Xavier's School, Belgaum
 Xavier Institute of Management and Entrepreneurship, Electronics City, Bangalore

Madhya Pradesh
 St. Xavier's Sr. Sec. Co-Ed School, Awadhpuri, Bhopal

Maharashtra
 St. Xavier's College, Mumbai
 St. Xavier's High School, Andheri, Mumbai
 St. Xavier High School, Bhayander, Mumbai
 St. Xavier's Boys Academy, Churchgate, Mumbai
 St. Xavier's High School, Borivli, Mumbai
 St. Xavier's High School, Fort, Mumbai
 St. Xavier's High School, Georai
 St. Xavier's High School, Manickpur
 St. Xavier's High School, Mira Road
 St. Xavier's High School, Nagpur
 St. Xavier's High School, Naigaon, Mumbai
 St. Xavier's High School, Nashik
 St. Xavier's High School, Nerul
 St. Xavier's High School, Panchgani
 St. Xavier's High School, Vile Parle West, Mumbai
 St. Xavier's School, Kolhapur
 St. Xavier's High School, Virar
 St. Xavier's School, Gondia
 St Xavier's Technical Institute, Mahim, Mumbai
 Xavier Institute of Engineering, Mahim

Odisha
 St. Xavier High School, Balipada, Baranga, Bhubaneswar
 St. Xavier High School, Bisiapada, Aragul, Jatani
 St. Xavier High School, Gadakana, Bhubaneswar
 St. Xavier High School, Khirkona, Simulia,  Balasore
 St. Xavier High School, Baripada
 St. Xavier's High School, Ambapua, Berhampur
 St. Xavier's High School, Cuttack
 St. Xavier's High School, Kedargouri, Bhubaneswar
 St. Xavier's High School, Khandagiri, Bhubaneswar
 St. Xavier's High School, Patia, Bhubaneswar
 St. Xavier's High School, Satya Nagar, Bhubaneswar
 St. Xavier's Model School, Cuttack
 St. Xavier's Public School, Angul
 St. Xavier's Public School, Bahalda
 St. Xavier's Public School, Baisinga
 St. Xavier's Public School, Balakati
 St. Xavier's Public School, Balia
 St. Xavier's Public School, Basudevpur
 St. Xavier's Public School, Bhawanipatna
 St. Xavier's Public School, Bhograi
 St. Xavier's Public School, Bhuban
 St. Xavier's Public School, Bhubaneswar-I
 St. Xavier's Public School, Bhubaneswar-II
 St. Xavier's Public School, Binka
 St. Xavier's Public School, Bolangir
 St. Xavier's Public School, Bonai
 St. Xavier's Public School, Boudh
 St. Xavier's Public School, Chatrapur
 St. Xavier's Public School, Cuttack
 St. Xavier's Public School, Cuttack-II
 St. Xavier's Public School, Delang
 St. Xavier's Public School, Dhalapathar
 St. Xavier's Public School, Dharmagad
 St. Xavier's Public School, Dhenkanal
 St. Xavier's Public School, Digapahandi (Franchisee withdrawn)
 St. Xavier's Public School, Dukura
 St. Xavier's Public School, Gopalpur
 St. Xavier's Public School, Gunupur
 St. Xavier's Public School, Hindol
 St. Xavier's Public School, Jaroli
 St. Xavier's Public School, Joda
 St. Xavier's Public School, Kandhal
 St. Xavier's Public School, Karanjia
 St. Xavier's Public School, Konark
 St. Xavier's Public School, Kullada
 St. Xavier's Public School, Kumarbandh
 St. Xavier's Public School, Madaranga
 St. Xavier's Public School, Maneswar
 St. Xavier's Public School, Narsinghpur
 St. Xavier's Public School, Padampur
 St. Xavier's Public School, Padmanavpur
 St. Xavier's Public School, Pandua
 St. Xavier's Public School, Parjang
 St. Xavier's Public School, Patapur
 St. Xavier's Public School, Pattamundai
 St. Xavier's Public School, Puruna katak
 St. Xavier's Public School, Raisuan
 St. Xavier's Public School, Remuna
 St. Xavier's Public School, Rengali
 St. Xavier's Public School, Rourkela
 St. Xavier's Public School, Sainkul
 St. Xavier's Public School, Singhpur
 St. Xavier's Public School, Sundergarh
 St. Xavier's Public School, Swampatna
 St. Xavier's Public School, Titilagarh
 Xaverian High School, Bhubaneswar
 Xavier Institute of Management, Bhubaneswar
 St. Xavier's Public School, Champua
 St. Xavier's Public School, Baitarani Road
 St. Xavier's Public School, Konisi, Ganjam.

Punjab
 St. Xavier's High School, Mohali
 St. Xavier's High School, Rampura Phul, Bathinda
 St. Xavier K. G Block (Lkg-3rd) School, Bathinda
 St. Xavier's International School, Patiala
 St. Xavier's Public School, Budhlada
 St. Xavier's Public School, Mandi-Dabwali
 St. Xavier's Senior Secondary School, Bathinda
 St. Xavier's Senior Secondary School, Chandigarh
 St. Xavier's World School, Bathinda
 St. Xavier's High School, Rampuraphul, Bathinda
 St. Xavier's Public School, Gurthari, Sangat Mandi, Dist- Bhatinda.

Rajasthan
 St. Xavier's College, Jaipur
 St. Xavier's Public School, Nirman Nagar, Jaipur
 St. Xavier's School, Behror
 St. Xavier's School, Bhiwadi
 St. Xavier's School, Jaipur
 St. Xavier's School, Nevta, Jaipur

Sikkim

Tamil Nadu
 St. Francis Xavier Anglo Indian Higher Secondary School, Broadway
 St. Xavier's College of Engineering, Chunkankadai
 St. Xavier's College, Palayamkottai
 St. Xaviers College, Tirunelveli
 St. Xavier's Higher Secondary School, Palayamkottai
 St. Xavier's Higher Secondary School, Thoothukudi

Uttar Pradesh
 St. Xavier's High School, Ailwal Azamgarh
 St. Francis Xavier's Inter College, Kanpur
 St. Xavier High School, Sultanpur
 St. Xavier's High School, Hardoi
 St. Xavier's Inter College, BHEL Jhansi
 St. Xavier's Public School, Dalla
 St. Xavier's Public School, Gorakhpur
 St. Xavier's Public School, Trilochan Mahadev
St. Xavier's Senior Secondary School, Balrampur
 St. Xavier's World School for Kids, Meerut
 St. Xavier's World School, Meerapur, Muzaffarnagar district
 St. Xavier's Senior Secondary School, Gonda
 St Xavier's High School, Greater Noida West, Uttar Pradesh
 St. Xavier's High School, Ghosi Mau
 St. Xavier's High School, Padrauna, Kushinagar

West Bengal
 St. Francis Xavier School, Salt Lake City (Bidhannagar)
 St. Xavier's College, Burdwan
 St. Xavier's College, Kolkata
 St. Xavier's Collegiate School, Kolkata
 St. Xavier's Institution (Panihati)
 St. Xavier's Public School, Coochbehar
 St. Xavier's Public School, Kolkata
 St. Xavier's Public School, Rampurhat
 St. Xavier's School, Malda district
 St. Xavier's School, Burdwan (Bardhaman)
 St. Xavier's School, Durgapur
 St. Xavier's School, Raiganj
 St. Xavier's University, Kolkata
 St. Xavier's Public School, Bagnan
 St. Xavier's Public School, Raghunathpur

Indonesia
 Franciscus Xaverius Junior High School, Palembang, South Sumatra
 Franciscus Xaverius Senior High School, Palembang, South Sumatra

Ireland
 St. Francis Xavier's College, Dublin, usually known as Belvedere College
 St. Francis Xavier Junior and Senior National Schools

Panama
 Colegio Javier, Panama City

Madagascar
 Xavier College, Fianarantsoa

Malaysia

Penang
 St. Xavier Branch School, Pulau Tikus
 St. Xavier's Institution, George Town

Perak
 St. Francis' School, Sitiawan

Melaka
 St. Francis' Institution

Sabah
 SMK St. Francis Convent (M), Kota Kinabalu

Micronesia
 Xavier High School, Weno, Chuuk

Nepal
 St. Xavier's College, Kathmandu, Bagmati
 St. Xavier's School, Godavari, Bagmati
 St. Xavier's School, Jawalakhel, Bagmati
 St. Xavier's School, Deonia, Mechi
 St. Xavier School, Gorkha

New Zealand
 Xavier College, Christchurch, Canterbury, now Catholic Cathedral College
St Francis Xavier Catholic Primary School, Whangarei
St Francis Xavier Catholic Primary School, Tawa, Wellington

Pakistan
 St. Francis Xavier Seminary, Yuhannabad, Punjab

Paraguay
 Colegio Técnico Javier, Asunción, Gran Asunción
 Instituto Superior de Estudios Humanísticos y Filosóficos San Francisco Javier (ISEHF), Asunción, Gran Asunción

Philippines
 Xavier School, San Juan City, Metro Manila and Nuvali, Canlubang, Calamba, Laguna
 Xavier University – Ateneo de Cagayan, Cagayan de Oro, Misamis Oriental

Spain
 St. Francis Xavier School, Burgos
 Xavier College, Santiago de Compostela
 Xavier College, Tudela

Sri Lanka
 St. Xavier's Boys' College, Mannar, Northern Province
 St. Xavier's College, Marawila, North Western Province
 St. Xavier's College, Nuwara Eliya, Central Province
 St. Xavier's Girls' College, Mannar, Northern Province

Taiwan
 St. Francis Xavier High School, Taoyuan District, Taoyuan

Thailand
 St. Francis Xavier Convent School, Bangkok
 St. Francis Xavier School, Nonthaburi

United Kingdom

England
 St. Francis Xavier's College, Liverpool
 St. Francis Xavier College, Clapham, London
 St Francis Xavier School, Richmond, North Yorkshire
 Xaverian College, Manchester
 St. Francis Xavier RC Primary, Oldbury, West Midlands

Scotland
 St. Francis Xavier's RC Primary, Falkirk

United States

Arizona
 Xavier College Preparatory, Phoenix

California
 Xavier College Preparatory High School, Palm Desert

Connecticut
 Xavier High School, Middletown

Georgia
 St. Francis Xavier Catholic School, Brunswick

Idaho
 Xavier Charter School, Twin Falls

Illinois
 St. Xavier University, Chicago

Iowa
 Xavier High School, Cedar Rapids

Kansas
 St. Xavier High School, Junction City

Kentucky
 St. Xavier High School, Louisville

Louisiana
 Xavier University of Louisiana, New Orleans
 Xavier University Preparatory School, New Orleans

Massachusetts
 Xavier High School, Concord
 Xaverian Brothers High School, Westwood

Minnesota
 St. Francis Xavier Catholic School, Sartell

New York
 St. Francis Xavier Elementary School, Bronx, New York City
 Xavier High School, Manhattan, New York City

Ohio
 St. Francis Xavier Seminary, now Athenaeum of Ohio, Cincinnati
 St. Xavier High School, Cincinnati
 St. Xavier Commercial School, Cincinnati (defunct)
 Xavier University, Cincinnati

Rhode Island
 St. Xavier's High School, Providence

South Carolina
 St. Francis Xavier High School, Sumter

Texas
 Xavier Educational Academy, Houston

Utah
 St. Francis Xavier School, Kearns

Wisconsin
 Xavier High School, Appleton

Zimbabwe
 St Francis Xavier College, Zvimba, Mashonaland West, commonly known as Kutama College

Fiction
 Xavier Institute for Higher Learning

See also
 St. Francis Xavier School (disambiguation)
 Xavier University (disambiguation)
 List of Jesuit institutions
 St. Xavier (disambiguation)
 Xavier (disambiguation)
 St. Francis Xavier (disambiguation)

References

Fran
schools named after Francis Xavier